Ainu, or more precisely Hokkaido Ainu, is a language spoken by a few elderly members of the Ainu people on the northern Japanese island of Hokkaido. It is a member of the Ainu language family, itself considered a language family isolate with no academic consensus of origin. It is classified as Critically Endangered by the UNESCO Atlas of the World's Languages in Danger.

Until the 20th century, the Ainu languages – Hokkaido Ainu and the now-extinct Kuril Ainu and Sakhalin Ainu – were spoken throughout Hokkaido, the southern half of the island of Sakhalin and by small numbers of people in the Kuril Islands. Due to the colonization policy employed by the Japanese government, the number of Hokkaido Ainu speakers decreased through the 20th century, and it is now moribund. A very few elderly people still speak the language fluently, though attempts are being made to revive it.

According to P. Elmer, the Ainu languages are a contact language, having strong influences from various Japonic dialects/languages during different stages of their development, suggesting early and intensive contact between the languages somewhere in the Tōhoku region, with Ainu borrowing a large amount of vocabulary and typological characteristics from early Japonic.

Speakers

According to UNESCO, Ainu is an endangered language, with few native speakers amongst the country's approximately 30,000 Ainu people, a number that may be higher due to a potentially low rate of self-identification as Ainu within the country's ethnic Ainu population. , Ethnologue has listed Ainu as class 8b, "nearly extinct".

A survey of the Ainu people's life was done by the Hokkaido government in 2017, and about 671 people participated in it. The participants were those who were believed to be descendants of Ainu or who joined Ainu families by marriage or adoption. The topic of the survey included the Ainu language, and in regard to fluency, 0.7% of participants answered that they would "be able to have a conversation" in the Ainu language, 3.4％ answered that they would "be able to have a conversation a little," 44.6％ answered they would "not be able to have a conversation but have a little knowledge of the Ainu language," and 48.1％ answered that they would "not be able to have a conversation or understand the language by listening".

The survey was done in 2006 and 2013 as well, and by comparing those with the 2017 survey, notable trends were observed: the percentage of people who answered  they would "be able to have a conversation in the Ainu language" declined in the age 60s group (2.3% in 2006, 1.9% in 2013, and 0.4% in 2017), but increased in the age 30s group (0% in 2006, 0% in 2013, and 2.3% in 2017). However, there was little change overall (0.7% in 2006, 0.9% in 2013, and 0.7% in 2017).

Recognition
The Japanese government made a decision to recognize Ainu as an indigenous language in June 2008. , the Japanese government is constructing a facility dedicated to preserving Ainu culture, including the language. This facility is called Upopoy, which is the first National Ainu museum that opened in Shiraoi, Hokkaido in July 2020. Upopoy is dedicated to promoting Ainu culture and language learning.

Phonology
Ainu syllables are (C)V(C); they have an obligatory vowel, and an optional syllable onset and coda consisting of one consonant. There are few consonant clusters.

Vowels
There are five vowels in Ainu:

Consonants

Obstruents  may be voiced  between vowels and after nasals. A glottal stop  is often inserted at the beginning of words, before an accented vowel, but is non-phonemic.

The Ainu language also has a pitch accent system. Generally, words containing affixes have a high pitch on a syllable in the stem. This will typically fall on the first syllable if that is long (has a final consonant or a diphthong), and will otherwise fall on the second syllable, though there are exceptions to this generalization.

Typology and grammar
Typologically, Ainu is similar in word order (and some aspects of phonology) to Japanese.

Ainu has a canonical word order of subject, object, verb, and uses postpositions rather than prepositions. Nouns can cluster to modify one another; the head comes at the end. Verbs, which are inherently either transitive or intransitive, accept various derivational affixes. Ainu does not have grammatical gender. Plurals are indicated by a suffix.

Applicatives may be used in Ainu to place nouns in dative, instrumental, comitative, locative, allative, or ablative roles. Besides freestanding nouns, these roles may be assigned to incorporated nouns, and such use of applicatives is in fact mandatory for incorporating oblique nouns. Like incorporation, applicatives have grown less common in the modern language.

Ainu has a closed class of plural verbs, and some of these are suppletive.

Ainu has a system of verbal affixes (shown below) which mark agreement for person and case. The specific cases that are marked differ by person, with nominative–accusative marking for the first person singular, tripartite marking for the first person plural and indefinite (or 'fourth') person, and direct or 'neutral' marking for the second singular and plural, and third persons (i.e. the affixes do not differ by case).

Sentence types

Intransitive sentences

Transitive and ditransitive sentences

Writing

The Ainu language is written in a modified version of the Japanese katakana syllabary, although it is possible for Japanese loan words and names to be written in kanji (for example, "mobile phone" can be written  or ). There is also a Latin-based alphabet in use. The Ainu Times publishes in both. Other phonemes use the same character as the IPA transcription given above. An equals sign (=) is used to mark morpheme boundaries, such as after a prefix. Its pitch accent is denoted by acute accent in Latin script (e.g., á). This is usually not denoted in katakana.

Rev. John Batchelor was an English missionary who lived among the Ainu, studied them and published many works on the Ainu language. Batchelor wrote extensively, both works about the Ainu language and works in Ainu itself. He was the first to write in Ainu and use a writing system for it. Batchelor's translations of various books of the Bible were published from 1887, and his New Testament translation was published in Yokohama in 1897 by a joint committee of the British and Foreign Bible Society, the American Bible Society, and the National Bible Society of Scotland. Other books written in Ainu include dictionaries, a grammar, and books on Ainu culture and language.

Special katakana for the Ainu language
A Unicode standard exists for a set of extended katakana (Katakana Phonetic Extensions) for transliterating the Ainu language and other languages written with katakana. These characters are used to write final consonants and sounds that cannot be expressed using conventional katakana. The extended katakana are based on regular katakana and either are smaller in size or have a handakuten.

This is a list of special katakana used in transcribing the Ainu language. Most of the characters are of the extended set of katakana, though a few have been used historically in Japanese, and thus are part of the main set of katakana. A number of previously proposed characters have not been added to Unicode as they can be represented as a sequence of two existing codepoints.

Basic syllables

Diphthongs
Final  is spelled y in Latin, small ィ in katakana. Final  is spelled w in Latin, small ゥ in katakana. Large イ and ウ are used if there is a morpheme boundary with イ and ウ at the morpheme head.  is spelled ae, アエ or アェ.

Example with initial k:

Since the above rule is used systematically, some katakana combinations have different sounds from conventional Japanese.

Oral literature
The Ainu have a rich oral tradition of hero-sagas called , which retain a number of grammatical and lexical archaisms.  were memorized and told at get-togethers and ceremonies that often lasted hours or even days. The Ainu also have another form of narrative often used called , which was used in the same contexts.

A native written form of the Ainu language has never existed; therefore, the Ainu people traditionally relied on memorization and oral communication to pass down their literature to the next generation. Ainu literature includes nonfiction, such as their history and "hunting adventures," and fiction such as stories about spiritual avatars, magic, myths, and heroes.

Research on oral literature 
The oral literature of the Ainu languages has been studied mainly by Japanese and European researchers; thus, Ainu literature has been transcribed using writing systems such as Japanese katakana (commonly used for foreign-language text) and the Latin alphabet, and documented in the languages of the researchers themselves. One prominent researcher of the Ainu languages is Bronisław Piłsudski, a Polish anthropologist who lived in Sakhalin from 1886 to 1905, and who published "Materials for the Study of the Ainu Language and Folklore" in 1912. In addition, Piłsudski made audio recordings from 1902 to 1903, which is believed to be the first attempt to do so in the history of Ainu oral literature study. Japanese linguist Kyosuke Kindaichi is also famous for his work on the oral literature of the Ainu languages, and for his publication  in 1913.

Recent history
Many of the speakers of Ainu lost the language with the advent of Japanese colonization, which formally began with the establishment of the Hokkaido Colonization Office in 1869. Japanese officials viewed the assimilation of Ainu a critical component of the Hokkaido colonization project, and developed policies designed to discourage or eliminate the use of the Ainu language, cultural practices, and traditional lifeways.  The assimilation included the exploitation of Ainu land, the commodification of their culture, and the placing of Ainu children in schools where they only learned Japanese.

More recently, the Japanese government has acknowledged the Ainu people as an indigenous population. As of 1997 they were given indigenous rights under the United Nations Declaration on the Rights of Indigenous Peoples (UNDRIP) to their culture, heritage, and language.

The Ainu Cultural Promotion Act in 1997 appointed the Foundation for Research and Promotion of Ainu Culture (FRPAC). This foundation is tasked with language education, where they promote Ainu language learning through training instructors, advanced language classes and creation and development of language materials.

Revitalization
In general, Ainu people are hard to find because they tend to hide their identity as Ainu, especially in the young generation. Two thirds of Ainu youth do not know that they are Ainu. In addition, because Ainu students were strongly discouraged from speaking their language at school, it has been challenging for the Ainu language to be revitalized.

Despite this, there is an active movement to revitalize the language, mainly in Hokkaido but also elsewhere such as Kanto. Ainu oral literature has been documented both in hopes of safeguarding it for future generations, as well as using it as a teaching tool for language learners. Beginning in 1987, the Ainu Association of Hokkaido with approximately 500 members began hosting 14 Ainu language classes, Ainu language instructors training courses and Family Ainu Learning Initiative and have released instructional materials on the language, including a textbook. Also, Yamato linguists teach Ainu and train students to become Ainu instructors in university. In spite of these efforts,  the Ainu language is not yet taught as a subject in any secondary school in Japan.

Due to the Ainu Cultural Promotion Act of 1997, Ainu dictionaries transformed and became tools for improving communication and preserving records of the Ainu language in order to revitalize the language and promote the culture. This act had aims to promote, disseminate, and advocate on behalf of Ainu cultural traditions. The main issue with this act however, was that not a single Ainu person was included in the "Expert" meetings prior to the laws passage, and as a result of this there was no mention of language education and how it should be carried out. The focus at this point was on Ainu culture revitalization rather than Ainu language revitalization.

As of 2011, there has been an increasing number of second-language learners, especially in Hokkaido, in large part due to the pioneering efforts of the late Ainu folklorist, activist and former Diet member Shigeru Kayano, himself a native speaker, who first opened an Ainu language school in 1987 funded by Ainu Kyokai. The Ainu Association of Hokkaido is the main supporter of Ainu culture in Hokkaido. Ainu language classes have been conducted in some areas in Japan and small numbers of young people are learning Ainu. Efforts have also been made to produce web-accessible materials for conversational Ainu because most documentation of the Ainu language focused on the recording of folktales. The Ainu language has been in media as well; the first Ainu radio program was called FM Pipaushi, which has run since 2001 along with 15-minute radio Ainu language lessons funded by FRPAC, and newspaper The Ainu Times has been established since 1997. In 2016, a radio course was broadcast by the STVradio Broadcasting to introduce Ainu language. The course put extensive efforts in promoting the language, creating 4 text books in each season throughout the year.

In addition, the Ainu language has been seen in public domains such as the outlet shopping complex's name, which means 'wind', in the Minami Chitose area and the name , meaning 'young', at a shopping centre in the Chitose area. There is also a basketball team in Sapporo founded under the name , after  'god of the wind' (its current name is Levanga Hokkaido). The well-known Japanese fashion magazine's name  means 'flower' in Ainu.

Another Ainu language revitalization program is Urespa, a university program to educate high-level persons on the language of the Ainu. The effort is a collaborative and cooperative program for individuals wishing to learn about Ainu languages. This includes performances which focus on the Ainu and their language, instead of using the dominant Japanese language.

Another form of Ainu language revitalization is an annual national competition, which is Ainu language-themed. People of many differing demographics are often encouraged to take part in the contest. Since 2017, the popularity of the contest has increased.

The Ainu language has also been featured in the manga and anime Golden Kamuy.

On 15 February 2019, Japan approved a bill to recognize the Ainu language for the first time and enacted the law on April 19, 2019.

Outside of Japan, there have also been efforts to revive the Ainu culture and language in other countries, including Australia and Russia.

Sample text
Below is a sample text from a traditional Ainu folktale, in Ainu, Japanese and English.

References

Bibliography

Further reading
Miyake, Marc. 2010. Is the itak an isolate?

External links

 Literature and materials for learning Ainu 
 The Book of Common Prayer in Ainu, translated by John Batchelor, digitized by Richard Mammana and Charles Wohlers
 Institute for the Study of Languages and Cultures of Ainu in Samani, Hokkaido
 A Grammar of the Ainu Language by John Batchelor
 An Ainu-English-Japanese Dictionary, including A Grammar of the Ainu Language by John Batchelor
 "The 'Greater Austric' hypothesis" by John Bengtson (undated)
 Ainu for Beginners  by Kane Kumagai, translated by Yongdeok Cho
 Radio lessons on Ainu language presented by Sapporo TV 
 A talking dictionary of Ainu: a new version of Kanazawa's Ainu conversational dictionary, with recordings of Mrs. Setsu Kurokawa

Ainu languages
Critically endangered languages
Language isolates of Asia
Languages of Japan
Subject–object–verb languages